Salvador Hernández Mondragón (born December 31, 1973) is an athlete and Paralympian from Morelia, Michoacán, Mexico competing mainly in category T51/T52 wheelchair racing events.

He competed in the 1996 Summer Paralympics in Atlanta, United States. There he finished seventh in the men's 1500 metres T51 event, finished seventh in the men's 100 metres T51 event, finished fifth in the men's 200 metres T51 event, finished fourth in the men's 400 metres T51 event, finished eighth in the men's 800 metres T51 event and finished tenth in the men's 800 metres T51 event. He also competed at the 2000 Summer Paralympics in Sydney, Australia having been reclassified as a T52 athlete.  He won a gold medal in the men's 200 metres T52 event, a gold medal in the men's 400 metres T52 event and a silver medal in the men's 100 metres T52 event.  He also competed at the 2004 Summer Paralympics in Athens, Greece, a gold medal in the men's 100 metres T52 event, a silver medal in the men's 200 metres T52 event and finished sixth in the men's 400 metres T52 event. He competed in his fourth Paralympics in 2008 in Beijing, China.  There he finished fourth in the men's 100 metres T52 event, finished seventh in the men's 200 metres T52 event and finished sixteenth in the men's 400 metres T52 event.

In 2016 Summer Paralympics he earned bronze medal in the 100 T52 final. Then he failed to reach the 400 meters final.

References

External links
 

1973 births
Living people
Sportspeople from Morelia
Paralympic athletes of Mexico
Athletes (track and field) at the 1996 Summer Paralympics
Athletes (track and field) at the 2000 Summer Paralympics
Athletes (track and field) at the 2004 Summer Paralympics
Athletes (track and field) at the 2008 Summer Paralympics
Athletes (track and field) at the 2012 Summer Paralympics
Athletes (track and field) at the 2016 Summer Paralympics
Paralympic gold medalists for Mexico
Paralympic silver medalists for Mexico
Paralympic bronze medalists for Mexico
Mexican male wheelchair racers
Paralympic wheelchair racers
Medalists at the 2000 Summer Paralympics
Medalists at the 2004 Summer Paralympics
Medalists at the 2012 Summer Paralympics
Medalists at the 2016 Summer Paralympics
Paralympic medalists in athletics (track and field)
Medalists at the 2011 Parapan American Games
Medalists at the 2015 Parapan American Games
Medalists at the World Para Athletics Championships